Christine St-Pierre (born June 10, 1953, in Saint-Roch des Aulnaies, Quebec) is a Canadian journalist and politician, who was MNA for the Montreal provincial riding of Acadie from 2007 to 2022 as a member of the Quebec Liberal Party.

Life and career
She holds a Bachelor of Social Science degree from the University of Moncton. Prior to her political career, St-Pierre worked as a journalist for Radio-Canada from 1976 to 2007. She was a political correspondent in Quebec City for five years before working as a correspondent in Washington, D.C. for four years before returning to Canada. During her stint as a political correspondent in Ottawa, she wrote a letter in Montreal's newspaper La Presse praising the Canadian military mission in Afghanistan. She was suspended due to rule infringement because of the statement of her opinion.

St-Pierre entered politics in the 2007 elections and won in Acadie. Jean Charest named her the Minister of Culture and Communications and Status of Women. In late 2011, when the Montreal Canadiens hired interim coach Randy Cunneyworth, she said she expected the Canadiens to rectify the situation as soon as possible as Cunneyworth speaks only English, and no French.

From 18 April 2007 to Septembre 2012, St-Pierre was responsible for Quebec's Charter of the French Language. She stated after she took her oath of office that she would have "zero tolerance" to infractions of Bill 101.

After the Liberals won the election in April 2014, she was named Minister of International Relations and La Francophonie.

Electoral record 

* Result compared to Action démocratique

See also
List of foreign ministers in 2017
List of current foreign ministers

References

External links
 

1953 births
Living people
Quebec Liberal Party MNAs
Canadian women journalists
Journalists from Quebec
Women MNAs in Quebec
Université de Moncton alumni
Members of the Executive Council of Quebec
21st-century Canadian politicians
21st-century Canadian women politicians
Women government ministers of Canada
Canadian women non-fiction writers